Taweel Provincial Park is a provincial park in British Columbia, Canada, located west of the town of Clearwater.

References

Provincial parks of British Columbia
Wells Gray-Clearwater